Gareth  Barry (born 23 February 1981) is an English former professional footballer who played as a midfielder. He made 653 Premier League appearances for Aston Villa, Manchester City, Everton and West Bromwich Albion, the highest number of Premier League appearances in history. He also represented England at international level.

Barry moved to Aston Villa from Brighton & Hove Albion as a youngster, and spent 12 years at the club. He captained Aston Villa and is eighth in their all-time list of appearances, with 441 across all competitions, including 365 in the Premier League. He joined Manchester City for a fee of £12 million in June 2009, where he won the FA Cup in 2011 and the Premier League title the following season. After a season on loan, he joined Everton on a three-year contract in July 2014, and on its expiration he signed for West Bromwich Albion.

Barry is a former England international, having won his first full cap in 2000 and captained the side in 2010 in a friendly against Egypt. He earned 53 caps in total, scoring 3 goals, and was included in England's squads at UEFA Euro 2000 and the 2010 FIFA World Cup.

Barry announced his retirement from football on 27 August 2020.

Club career

Aston Villa

Barry joined Aston Villa from Brighton and Hove Albion as a trainee in 1997, along with Michael Standing. The move was controversial, for the Brighton board had demanded £2.5 million for the two players; the Football Association's transfer tribunal panel came up with a deal which would have seen Brighton make £2.4 million in the event of Barry and Standing making international appearances for England, as well as sell-on clauses. Following a season in the reserves and academy sides he played his first senior match for Villa on 2 May 1998, a 3–1 win at Sheffield Wednesday, as a 49th-minute substitute for Ian Taylor. On 24 April 1999, on at half time for the injured Dion Dublin, he finished Steve Stone's cross 12 minutes later for his first professional goal, concluding a 2–0 win over Nottingham Forest at Villa Park. He started in the 2000 FA Cup Final at the old Wembley Stadium, which Villa lost 1–0 to Chelsea. In August 2001, he featured as Villa defeated FC Basel 5–2 on aggregate in the final of the 2001 UEFA Intertoto Cup.

In November 2007, it was reported that Aston Villa were set to award Barry a testimonial, at the age of just 26, to recognise his 10 years at the club. On 5 April 2008, Barry helped to break a run of bad form, scoring in a 4–0 victory over Bolton Wanderers. He scored two goals (his first two from open play that season) and he was also credited with two assists.

As of April 2008, Barry, approaching 400 total appearances for Aston Villa, was the longest serving player in the team. During the league game against Bolton Wanderers on 28 October 2007, Barry became the youngest player to appear in 300 Premier League games (aged 26 years 247 days), surpassing former record-holder Frank Lampard.

In May 2008, Liverpool made a series of bids to buy Barry, all of which were rejected by Aston Villa. Barry publicly criticised his manager, Martin O'Neill, accusing him of making no attempt to keep him at the club, and further stating a desire to join Liverpool in order to compete in the Champions League. O'Neill denied this claim and Barry was officially disciplined for giving an unauthorised interview. A further bid from Liverpool of around £15 million was rejected as it was still short of Villa's £18 million asking price. Steve Finnan had then been offered in part-exchange in the deal, but the fee Villa wanted in this case was understood by BBC Sport to be £17 million with Finnan included. Barry was then stripped of the team captaincy, fined two weeks' wages and banned from training with the Villa squad.

He remained an Aston Villa player, starting in a UEFA Cup tie against Fimleikafélag Hafnarfjarðar, in which he scored in a 4–1 win. The goal against Hafnarfjordur was Barry's first European goal since he scored a penalty in the Intertoto Cup against Celta Vigo in 2000. On 18 September 2008, he made his 400th appearance in a Villa shirt in the UEFA Cup away to Litex Lovech, scoring a penalty as Villa won the match 3–1. Barry scored again for Villa as they beat Ajax 2–1 in their first UEFA Cup group match on 23 October 2008. Owing to the transfer saga, O'Neill had taken the captaincy away from him and handed it to centre-back Martin Laursen for the 2008–09 season. Following Laursen's injury, the captaincy was restored to Barry in January 2009. In total, he made 441 appearances for Aston Villa, scoring 52 goals in the process.

Manchester City
On 2 June 2009, Barry signed a five-year contract with Manchester City for a fee of £12 million and wore the number 18 shirt. Many Aston Villa fans publicly criticised Barry for this move considering his alleged desire to play in the UEFA Champions League. However, Barry responded to this positively and wrote a letter to the Birmingham Mail in which he thanked the Villa fans for their support while he was there, claiming that his move to City was for a "new challenge". He made his debut for City in the opening league game of the season against Blackburn Rovers at Ewood Park, playing the full 90 minutes in a 2–0 victory.

Barry scored his first Premier League goal for City against Manchester United at Old Trafford on 20 September 2009 levelling the scores at 1–1, but City went on to lose the match 4–3. Three days later, he scored a header in a League Cup tie with Fulham to make the scores 1–1 and City went on to win in extra time. On 16 February 2010, a week before his 29th birthday he played the full 90 minutes and scored a late equaliser in a 1–1 draw against Stoke City at the Britannia Stadium. Barry started the 2011 FA Cup Final as City defeated Stoke 1–0.

Barry scored his first goal of the 2011–12 season on 21 August in a 3–2 win against Bolton Wanderers. On 3 January 2012 he was sent off for the first time since joining Manchester City, in a 3–0 league win against Liverpool. Barry made 34 Premier League appearances in the 2011–12 season as Manchester City won the league title, the club's first in 44 years. On 11 December 2012, Barry was charged with misconduct by the Football Association, and two days later he was fined £8,000 and banned for one match for the offence, having verbally abused a match official.

Everton

On 2 September 2013, transfer deadline day, Barry was loaned to Everton in a season-long deal. He made his debut on 15 September in a 1–0 home league win against Chelsea during which he made a block on Samuel Eto'o which prevented a certain goal, later being named man of the match. Later in the month Barry became the 10th player in Premier League history to make 500 career appearances in a 3–2 win over Newcastle United. He scored his first goal for the club in a 2–1 victory over Hull City on 19 October; the goal was originally awarded to Kevin Mirallas; however, the goals panel ruled that en route to the goal, Barry was deemed to have got the last touch on the ball before it beat Hull keeper Allan McGregor. He scored a long range effort in a 2–0 victory against Norwich City on 11 January 2014. He became a mainstay in Everton's midfield during the season and forged a partnership with James McCarthy. Barry completed the most passes of any Everton player during his spell as he helped the club amass a club record of 72 Premier League points to finish fifth. Barry was booked 10 times during the season to have the worst disciplinary record at the club.

On 8 July 2014, following his successful loan spell at Goodison Park, Barry completed a permanent move to Everton, signing a three-year deal having been released by Manchester City following the expiry of his contract. On 26 December, he was booked for a foul on Steven Nzonzi in a 1–0 home loss to Stoke City, making him the first player to receive 100 yellow cards in the Premier League era. Barry was sent off with two minutes remaining away to Chelsea on 11 February 2015 for a foul on Willian, causing a melée in which he was confronted by Branislav Ivanović; the game was scoreless at the incident and Everton eventually lost 1–0.

Barry was sent off in added time at the end of a 2–1 loss at Arsenal on 24 October 2015, receiving a second yellow card for a foul on Kieran Gibbs. Following Everton's 2–1 win over Manchester City in the first leg of the League Cup semi-final on 6 January 2016, manager Roberto Martínez described Barry as "one of the best English players ever." On 12 March 2016 in a 2–0 win over Chelsea in the FA Cup quarter-final, Barry was booked for a confrontation with Diego Costa, who was given a second yellow card for his part and sent off. Barry, who was later sent off himself, denied suggestions that he had been bitten on the neck by his opponent. Facing Sunderland in May 2016, he set a new record by starting a Premier League game for the 572nd time.

Barry became the third player (after Ryan Giggs and Frank Lampard) to make 600 Premier League appearances when he played against Middlesbrough on 17 September 2016, and equalised from a corner-kick routine in a 3–1 victory.

West Bromwich Albion
On 15 August 2017, Barry signed for fellow Premier League side West Bromwich Albion for an undisclosed fee. Four days later he made his debut for the Baggies in a 1–0 win at Burnley and manager Tony Pulis praised him as "absolutely fantastic". On 25 September, Barry captained West Brom as he made his 633rd Premier League appearance, beating Ryan Giggs' record of 632, in a 2–0 loss to Arsenal at the Emirates Stadium. At the time of breaking the record, Barry was eighth in English top-flight appearances since the Second World War.

After an injury brought his 2018–19 season to a premature end, Barry was released by West Brom in July 2019. After he recovered, the club expressed interest in re-signing him in October 2019, but a clause in his previous deal meant his former club, Everton, would be due a further payment if he received a contract extension. He was eventually re-signed on 4 November 2019 until the end of the 2019–20 season.

International career
Barry first represented England at under-16 level, and also played for the under-18s. He made his England under-21 debut against the Czech Republic in 1998, and made 27 appearances for the under-21 side between 1998 and 2003. This was a record at the time, though has since been surpassed.

Barry was first picked for the senior England side by Kevin Keegan. After an injury to Jason Wilcox, he travelled to UEFA Euro 2000, but did not feature in any of the side's games. Barry made his England debut as a substitute in a pre-Euro 2000 friendly against Ukraine on 31 May 2000. His first start for England was in the 1–1 draw against France on 2 September 2000. He appeared as a half-time substitute in England's first 2002 FIFA World Cup qualifier against Germany in the final match played at the old Wembley Stadium. After the resignation of Keegan, Barry was selected to start at left-back in England's next qualifier away in Finland by caretaker coach Howard Wilkinson.

After Sven-Göran Eriksson's appointment, Barry returned to play for the England under-21 team. The emergence of Ashley Cole and Wayne Bridge as England's first- and second-choice left-backs restricted Barry's chances of a recall; however, he was named in May 2003 in England's squad to play friendly matches against South Africa and Serbia & Montenegro, making a late substitute appearance in both matches.

On 2 February 2007, Barry was recalled to the England squad, following a four-year international exile, by Eriksson's replacement Steve McClaren. The midfielder had been resigned to never winning another cap under Eriksson. He was brought on at the beginning of the second half of the friendly match against Spain five days later, as substitute for Steven Gerrard, and played left midfield for the majority of the game, moving to left-back when Stewart Downing was brought on; England lost 1–0. On 25 May, Barry played for England B in a 3–1 victory over Albania, getting an assist for England's first goal scored by Alan Smith.

In August 2007, Barry became one of the few players to represent England at both the old and new Wembley Stadiums by coming on as a substitute, replacing Michael Carrick in a friendly against Germany.

Barry started in central midfield for England against Israel on 8 September 2007, as a replacement for the injured Owen Hargreaves, and recorded two assists. He kept his place with Hargreaves declared unfit for the match against Russia on 12 September 2007, and produced another impressive display. BBC pundits Ian Wright and Alan Shearer commented that Barry was immense in the centre of midfield alongside Gerrard, forming a wonderful partnership together, and further commented that he should have been made man of the match overall for the two performances against Israel and Russia.

He was also given the official man of the match for England's UEFA Euro 2008 home qualifier against Estonia. He was selected to start against Switzerland on 6 February 2008, England's first match under new coach Fabio Capello. He was again selected to start in England's friendly away to France on 26 March 2008. Barry scored his first international goal against Trinidad and Tobago on 1 June 2008; this completed a personal treble for Barry, as he also captained England in the second half of his 20th cap.

He appeared in every one of England's ten games during the 2008–09 season up until the game against Andorra on 10 June 2009, for which he was suspended, having picked up yellow cards in the games against Ukraine and Kazakhstan. In the game against Kazakhstan on 6 June, he scored his second international goal on his 13th cap, heading home a cross from Steven Gerrard.

Playing for England in a friendly against Egypt at Wembley, Barry was handed the captaincy in a game that they won 3–1, with his then Manchester City teammate Shaun Wright-Phillips on the scoresheet. However, an ankle injury picked up while playing for Manchester City made him uncertain for the 2010 FIFA World Cup, yet he was included in the 23-man England squad for the tournament. He missed the first game but played in the remaining three games for England, including the full 90 minutes of the second-round 4–1 defeat against Germany in Bloemfontein, which sent England out of the competition.

On 9 February 2011, he was again made captain for the final 10 minutes of the match against Denmark, after Frank Lampard and Ashley Cole had already worn the skipper's armband. On 29 March 2011, Barry skippered England against Ghana in a friendly match at Wembley in a 1–1 draw. On 4 June 2011, he was an unused substitute against Switzerland in a Euro 2012 qualifier at Wembley in a 2–2 draw. On 12 November 2011, he earned his 50th cap for England in the 1–0 win over Spain in a friendly after coming on as a substitute.

On 15 November 2011, Barry scored England's 2,000th international goal in a 1–0 friendly win over Sweden.

Barry was called into the England squad for UEFA Euro 2012 but ruled out of the tournament after picking up a groin injury. He was forced off less than 30 minutes after being introduced as a half-time substitute in the pre-tournament friendly against Norway in Oslo on 26 May 2012.

Personal life
Barry married his childhood sweetheart Louise in the summer of 2007.

Barry is best friends with Michael Standing, who signed for Aston Villa on the same day as him from Brighton in 1997. The pair have known each other since they were both ten years old. In 2009, Barry appointed Standing as his new agent after terminating his partnership with previous agent Alex Black.

Barry's nephew, Bradley Barry, is also a professional footballer.

In July 2018, his brother Marc died in a vehicle incident.

Career statistics

Club

International

England score listed first, score column indicates score after each Barry goal.

Honours
Aston Villa
UEFA Intertoto Cup: 2001

Manchester City
Premier League: 2011–12
FA Cup: 2010–11; runner-up 2012–13

Individual
Everton Player of the Season: 2015–16
Everton Players' Player of the Season: 2015–16

References

External links

Gareth Barry profile at the Everton F.C. website
Gareth Barry profile  at the Football Association website

1981 births
Living people
Sportspeople from Hastings
English footballers
Association football midfielders
Brighton & Hove Albion F.C. players
Aston Villa F.C. players
Manchester City F.C. players
Everton F.C. players
West Bromwich Albion F.C. players
Premier League players
English Football League players
England youth international footballers
England under-21 international footballers
England B international footballers
England international footballers
UEFA Euro 2000 players
2010 FIFA World Cup players
FA Cup Final players